"Soccer tennis" may refer to:

 Football tennis, a sport played on a field in which players hit a football (soccer ball) over a low net
 Teqball, a sport resembling table tennis in which players hit a soccer ball (football) across a curved table

See also
 Footvolley, a sport which combines aspects of beach volleyball and association football
 Soccer (disambiguation)
 Football (disambiguation)
 Tennis (disambiguation)